is a 2D side-scrolling platform video game developed and published in 2012 by Nintendo as a launch game for the Wii U. It is the fourth entry in the New Super Mario Bros. series, and is the first mainline Mario game to be released in high-definition graphics. The game is a sequel to New Super Mario Bros. Wii (2009) and New Super Mario Bros. 2 (2012).

As part of the "Year of Luigi" campaign, a downloadable expansion to the game, New Super Luigi U, was released in June 2013. A standalone retail version was released the following month and later copies of the base game included the expansion on disc.

The game received generally positive reviews and is one of the best-selling games on the Wii U. An enhanced port for the Nintendo Switch, titled  developed by the successor to Nintendo Entertainment Analysis and Development, Nintendo Entertainment Planning and Development, was released on January 11, 2019. As of December 2022, the Switch version had sold 14.75 million units worldwide. Between both versions, a total of 20.75 million units have been sold worldwide, making it one of the best selling video games of all time.

Gameplay 

New Super Mario Bros. U iterates on the gameplay featured in New Super Mario Bros. Wii with additional features. The objective of each level is to reach the goal flag at the end of each level while avoiding enemies and hazards. The game can be controlled either using Wii U Pro Controllers, Wii Remotes, or Off-TV Play using the Wii U GamePad, where the game can be played solely on the GamePad's screen. Four players each using a controller play as a different character, being Mario, Luigi, Yellow Toad, and Blue Toad. In the "Boost Mode" feature, a fifth player using the Wii U GamePad can interact with the environment, such as putting blocks down that can be stepped on or stunning enemies by holding down on them. Certain game modes also allow players to play their own custom Mii characters. Bowser, The Koopalings, Kamek, Boom Boom, and Bowser Jr. appear as the game's main villains. Nabbit is a new antagonist who is chased after stealing an item from Red Toad. Once Nabbit is caught, Toad rewards the item to the player.

Along with returning elements such as Ice Flowers and Yoshis, the flying squirrel is new a power-up that allows players to glide across long distances or slowly descend down vertical paths and cling to the side of the walls. Additionally, Baby Yoshis are an item can be carried by a player, with each baby Yoshi having a special ability dependent on its color, such as inflating in midair or illuminating dark areas. Some older power-ups also have new abilities, such as the Mini Mushroom now allowing players to run up walls. New Super Mario Bros. U features one large map containing all the game's worlds and levels, similar to that of Super Mario World. Some levels have multiple exits that lead to the different areas on the map.

The game features two new modes of play, "Challenge Mode" and "Boost Rush". Challenge Mode adds restrictions and conditions, such as clearing levels with a short timer. Boost Rush takes place on an automatically scrolling level which increases in speed as players collect coins, with the goal of clearing the stage as quickly as possible. "Coin Battle" from New Super Mario Bros. Wii also returns, with the player now being able to customize the battles with the GamePad to place the coins and Star Coins on the course.  The Super Guide, which takes control of the player's character and moves it automatically through a level, is available in case the player has failed a level multiple consecutive times. The game originally utilized the now defunct Miiverse, which allowed players to share comments about particular levels with one another.

Plot 
Princess Peach is held captive in her castle by Bowser, Bowser Jr., and the Koopalings who invade and use a giant mechanical arm to throw Mario, Luigi, and two Toads far away. Mario and friends must now travel across this new land returning to Peach's castle in order to save her. On the way, they encounter seven Koopalings each controlling their own worlds, plus Kamek, Nabbit, Bowser Jr., and many minor enemies like Goomba. By conquering them, they get closer to Peach's castle, which has been transformed into an evil reflection of Bowser. By defeating Bowser, the castle returns to normal. As the heroes celebrate, Bowser Jr. and the Koopalings attempt to escape, leaving Bowser behind. He manages to jump up onto the airship, but his weight causes it to crash, and they are forced to flee on Bowser Jr.'s Koopa Clown Car.

Development 
Development of New Super Mario Bros. U started shortly after the release of New Super Mario Bros. Wii and spanned three years. The game, initially titled New Super Mario Bros. Mii, was first revealed at E3 2011 as one of several tech demos demonstrating the capabilities of Wii U. The demo's visual style duplicated New Super Mario Bros. Wii, but with high-definition graphics, and playable Mii characters alongside Mario and Luigi. Shigeru Miyamoto later announced that the Mario demo would be released as a full game for the system, and would be demonstrated in its revised form at E3 2012. There, the new game, New Super Mario Bros. U, was revealed as a launch game for the upcoming Wii U console.

Producer Takashi Tezuka explained he had created the game to take advantage of the Wii U hardware, focusing on the GamePad, for which Boost Mode was created. He explained that levels were created for single-player mode, without much thought of multiplayer during creation. He did not think too much about level design because he thought it would keep the players in a controlled experience, and decided to keep it more open. He was comfortable giving the player open access to placing blocks.

Creating new concepts, Tezuka created the flying squirrel suit to allow for open movement in the air. However, he kept it partially limited to keep the player from over-using it. The power-up glides horizontally to differ it from the propeller suit in New Super Mario Bros. Wii which can fly vertically. The developers used an open world map layout due to nostalgia for Super Mario World. Tezuka wanted a feature where players can interact worldwide, so Miiverse functionality was implemented. He added playable Mii characters to differentiate onscreen players, and HD graphics to help make each character more recognizable.

DLC and ports

New Super Luigi U 

To celebrate the Year of Luigi, Nintendo announced DLC known as New Super Luigi U on February 14, 2013. Though much of the content is reused from the base game, notable differences include Mario's absence and Luigi's role as the main character. Along with this, Luigi has his flutter jump from Super Mario Bros. 2 and the overall level design is more difficult when compared to the base game. The DLC was released along  with a update to the base game on June 20, 2013, and as a standalone disc on August 15, 2013. Later, a bundle known as New Super Mario Bros. U + New Super Luigi U was released on November 1st, 2013, along with the Mario and Luigi U Wii U set. It was released as a standalone game on October 16th, 2015.

New Super Mario Bros. U Deluxe 
An enhanced port for the Nintendo Switch was announced in the Nintendo Direct on September 13, 2018 and released worldwide on January 11, 2019. Prior to its announcement, rumors of a Switch port had surfaced stating that the game will be remade and include both the original game and the New Super Luigi U campaign, with "New Super Mario Bros. U Deluxe" as the pending title. The game was upgraded to run at native 1080p instead of 720p and now features HD Rumble support throughout. Toadette and Nabbit are introduced as playable characters, with the former gaining access to a brand new power up called the Super Crown and the latter now being playable in the original campaign instead of being exclusive to the New Super Luigi U DLC.  Any character can be picked in single player, rather than forcing the player to play as Mario. Blue Toad was changed to be a color variation of Yellow Toad, both of which are now simply known as Toad. Boost Mode was also removed, along with its associated challenges in Challenge Mode.

Reception 

New Super Mario Bros. U was positively received by critics, with most praise going towards gameplay. GamesMaster magazine called it "a great excuse for families to gather round the TV, and an enticing glimpse of Mario's HD future". IGN stated that "Nintendo's approach here strikes a great balance in all areas, ranging from its difficulty to design to enemies and bosses". Joystiq commented "There's a sense of wonder again, of exploration and discovery. I'm not quite prepared to say New Super Mario Bros. U fully recaptures the spark of Mario's 2D heyday, but it's an impressive step in the right direction". Game Informer considered it the best game in the New Super Mario Bros. series, saying it had "Some of the most creative NSMB levels Nintendo has created". Many critics like the jump from regular graphics to HD, and enjoyed the visuals. GameSpot observed how "It's a challenging platformer, an excellent recreation of Mario's best moments, and it's the perfect way to kick-off Nintendo's journey into HD." Destructoid stated that however there isn't as much charm as past games, HD graphics was a key feature.

Giant Bomb was slightly more critical, noting "Everything about New Super Mario Bros. U is pretty exciting, except the game itself. Is it possible that this is the best game in the 'New' series to date—not to mention one of the best exclusive Wii U games on the market, by default—and at the same time kind of flatly uninteresting? Apparently so. The game is perfectly well made for what it is, and I had plenty of fun playing it in short bursts here and there, but at this point the series' by-the-numbers design philosophy is starting to lend the name 'New Super Mario Bros.' a degree of unintentional irony".

New Super Mario Bros. U Deluxe also received positive reviews, with a score of 80 on review aggregator Metacritic.

Sales 
, New Super Mario Bros. U has worldwide sales of 5.81 million units.

New Super Mario Bros. U Deluxe yielded sales of 455,006 physical copies within its first month on sale in Japan, outperforming its Wii U counterpart.  more than 747,589 physical copies have been sold in Japan., and in January 2021, it was reported that Japanese sales figures had surpassed one million. Deluxe also debuted at the top of the charts in the United Kingdom, with 56% more units in its first week than when the Wii U version launched, and remained the UK's best-selling game in its second week on sale. , 14.75 million copies of Deluxe have been sold worldwide, making it one of the best-selling games on the Nintendo Switch; both versions of the game have sold a combined total of 20.57 million copies.

Awards

Notes

References

External links 
 

2012 video games
2019 video games
Asymmetrical multiplayer video games
Cooperative video games
Multiplayer and single-player video games
Nintendo Entertainment Planning & Development games
Nintendo Network games
Nintendo Switch games
Side-scrolling video games
Video games developed in Japan
Video game sequels
Video games with downloadable content
Video games with expansion packs
Video games about size change
Wii U eShop games
Wii U games
Super Mario
Video games scored by Mahito Yokota
Pack-in video games
Video games produced by Takashi Tezuka
Spike Video Game Award winners